Gloria Stefani Saleb López (born 12 June 1991) is a Paraguayan footballer who plays as a goalkeeper for Cerro Porteño. She was a member of the Paraguay women's national team.

International career
Saleb played the 2018 Copa América Femenina.

References

1991 births
Living people
Women's association football goalkeepers
Paraguayan women's footballers
Paraguay women's international footballers
Cerro Porteño players
Paraguayan women's futsal players
21st-century Paraguayan women
20th-century Paraguayan women
Paraguayan people of Syrian descent